The 2017 Offaly Senior Football Championship was the 120th edition of Offaly GAA's premier Gaelic football competition for senior graded clubs in County Offaly, Ireland. Eight teams compete, with the winner representing Offaly in the Leinster Senior Club Football Championship.

The championship starts a league stage and progresses to a knockout stage.

Rhode were the defending champions after they defeated Ferbane in the previous years final.

This was Cappincur's return to the senior grade after claiming the 2016 Offaly Senior B Football Championship title.

St Rynagh's were relegated to the 2018 S.B.F.C. after 7 years in the top-flight.

Team changes 

The following teams have changed division since the 2016 championship season.

To S.F.C. 
Promoted from 2016 Offaly Senior B Football Championship
 Cappincur – (Intermediate Champions)

From S.F.C. 
Relegated to 2017 Offaly Senior B Football Championship
 Ballycumber

League Phase 
The top two in the group went directly to the semi-final. The third through sixth place teams contested the quarter-finals. The two bottom finishers qualified for the Relegation Final.

Round 1
 Tullamore 4-15, 2-6 Cappincur, 8/4/2017,  
 Clara 2-9, 0-13 Edenderry, 8/4/2017,  
 Rhode 0-17, 0-7 St Rynagh's, 9/4/2017,
 Ferbane 4-7, 1-14 Gracefield, 9/4/2017,  

Round 2
 Rhode 0-13, 1-9 Cappincur, 22/4/2017, 
 Clara 1-11, 0-11 Gracefield, 22/4/2017, 
 Tullamore 2-6, 1-9 Ferbane, 23/4/2017,
 Edenderry 2-18, 0-9 St Rynagh's, 23/4/2017,

Round 3
 Edenderry 1-14, 2-10 Gracefield, 7/7/2017,
 Cappincur 1-10, 0-10 St Rynagh's, 7/7/2017,
 Rhode 1-15, 2-9 Ferbane, 8/7/2017,
 Tullamore 3-9, 0-16 Clara, 8/7/2017,

Round 4
 Tullamore 1-8, 1-8 Edenderry, 22/7/2017,
 St Rynagh's 1-11, 0-13 Gracefield, 22/7/2017,
 Ferbane 5-11, 0-13 Cappincur, 23/7/2017,
 Rhode 2-18, 0-15 Clara, 23/7/2017,

Round 5
 Gracefield 4-9, 0-8 Tullamore, 4/8/2017,
 Clara 4-6, 1-9 Cappincur, 6/8/2017,
 Ferbane 3-9, 0-11 St Rynagh's, 6/8/2017,
 Rhode 0-9, 0-6 Edenderry, 9/8/2017,

Round 6
 Tullamore 0-10, 0-7 St Rynagh's, 19/8/2017,
 Ferbane 0-13, 0-7 Clara, 20/8/2017,
 Rhode 1-14, 1-10 Gracefield, 20/8/2017,
 Edenderry 2-16, 2-6 Cappincur, 20/8/2017,

Round 7
 Ferbane 2-15, 1-13 Edenderry, 1/9/2017,
 Clara 2-15, 0-5 St Rynagh's, 1/9/2017,
 Rhode 2-12, 1-12 Tullamore, 1/9/2017,
 Gracefield 0-10, 0-9 Cappincur, 1/9/2017,

Knock-out Stage

Last Four 
The top four finishers in the league qualified for the quarter-finals.

Quarter-finals

Semi-finals

Final

Relegation play-off 
The two bottom-placed teams from each group play off in the relegation final with the loser relegated to the 2018 Senior B Championship.

 Cappincur 0-16, 2-7 St Rynagh's, Pullough, 15/9/2017,

References 

Offaly Senior Football Championship
Offaly Senior Football Championship